Microphotolepis is a genus of slickheads found in the Pacific and Indian Oceans.

Species
There are currently two recognized species in this genus:
 Microphotolepis multipunctata Sazonov & Parin, 1977
 Microphotolepis schmidti (Angel & Verrier, 1931)

References

Alepocephalidae